Asthenes modesta serrana is a small South American bird, a subspecies of the cordilleran canastero.  It is found in the Sierra de Famatina, in La Rioja Province of northern Argentina, at an altitude of about 3200 m.

References

Asthenes
Birds described in 1986